Paul G. Wolf (October 5, 1915 – October 14, 1972) was an American competition swimmer. He won a silver medal as a member of the second-place U.S. team in the 4×200-meter freestyle relay, together with teammates Ralph Flanagan, John Macionis and Jack Medica. In 1941 he enlisted to the U.S. Navy.

See also
 List of Olympic medalists in swimming (men)
 List of University of Southern California people
 World record progression 4 × 100 metres freestyle relay

References

1915 births
1972 deaths
American male freestyle swimmers
World record setters in swimming
Olympic silver medalists for the United States in swimming
People from Madison, Indiana
Swimmers at the 1936 Summer Olympics
USC Trojans men's swimmers
Medalists at the 1936 Summer Olympics
United States Navy personnel of World War II
United States Navy sailors
Military personnel from Indiana